Carroll Building may refer to:
A.R. Carroll Building, Canehill, Arkansas, listed on the National Register of Historic Places (NRHP)
 Carroll Building (Norwich, Connecticut), NRHP-listed
 Carroll Building (Apopka, Florida), NRHP-listed

See also
Carroll House (disambiguation)
Carroll-Richardson Grist Mill, Cave Spring, Georgia, NRHP-listed
John Carroll University North Quad Historic District, University Heights, Ohio, NRHP-listed